Jean-Frédéric Edelmann (born Johann Friedrich Edelmann; 5 May 1749 – 17 July 1794) was a French classical composer. He was born in Strasbourg to a Protestant family of Alsatian descent. After studying law and music, he moved to Paris in 1774 where he played and taught the piano. It is possible that Edelmann worked for some time in London. During the French Revolution he was appointed administrator of the Bas-Rhin. In late May 1794 he was arrested after a false accusation of treason (he was in fact an opposer of the terroristic policy and paid the hatred of Saint-Just). Sentenced to death by the Revolutionary Tribunal on 17 July 1794 (29th Messidor), he was executed the same day by guillotine in Place de la Barrière du Trône together with his brother Louis, other two Strasbourg citizens, and the sixteen Carmelite nuns of Compiègne (only eleven days before the fall of Robespierre).

Edelmann composed two operas, an oratorio and various pieces of chamber music.

Works list

Published works
 Op. 1 No. 1 \ Keyboard Sonata in E flat major
 Op. 1 No. 2 \ Keyboard Sonata in E major
 Op. 1 No. 3 \ Keyboard Sonata in D major
 Op. 1 No. 4 \ Keyboard Sonata in A major
 Op. 1 No. 5 \ Keyboard Sonata in D major
 Op. 1 No. 6 \ Keyboard Sonata in F sharp major
 Op. 2 No. 1 \ Keyboard Sonata in C major
 Op. 2 No. 2 \ Keyboard Sonata in F major
 Op. 2 No. 3 \ Keyboard Sonata in C major
 Op. 2 No. 4 \ Keyboard Sonata in G major
 Op. 2 No. 5 \ Keyboard Sonata in E major
 Op. 2 No. 6 \ Keyboard Sonata in B flat major
 Op. 3 No. 1 \ Keyboard Sonata in E flat minor
 Op. 3 No. 2 \ Keyboard Sonata in F major
 Op. 4 \ Keyboard Concerto in D major
 Op. 5 No. 1 \ Keyboard Sonata in A major
 Op. 5 No. 2 \ Keyboard Sonata in G minor
 Op. 5 No. 3 \ Keyboard Sonata in C minor
 Op. 5 No. 4 \ Keyboard Sonata in D minor
 Op. 6 No. 1 \ Keyboard Sonata in G minor
 Op. 6 No. 2 \ Keyboard Sonata in D minor
 Op. 6 No. 3 \ Keyboard Sonata in C major
 Op. 7 No. 1 \ Keyboard Sonata in E flat major
 Op. 7 No. 2 \ Keyboard Sonata in G minor
 Op. 8 No. 1 \ Keyboard Sonata in C minor
 Op. 8 No. 2 \ Keyboard Sonata in E minor (Mlle Edelmann)
 Op. 8 No. 3 \ Keyboard Sonata in D major
 Op. 9 No. 1 \ Keyboard Quartet in E flat major
 Op. 9 No. 2 \ Keyboard Quartet in C minor
 Op. 9 No. 3 \ Keyboard Quartet in G minor
 Op. 9 No. 4 \ Keyboard Quartet in D major
 Op. 10 No. 1 \ Keyboard Sonata in F minor
 Op. 10 No. 2 \ Keyboard Sonata in E flat major
 Op. 10 No. 3 \ Keyboard Sonata in C minor
 Op. 10 No. 4 \ Keyboard Sonata in E major
 Op. 11 \ Opera La bergère des Alpes (Paris, Tuileries 20 July 1781)
 Op. 12 \ Keyboard Concerto in A minor
 Op. 13 No. 1 \ Keyboard Quartet in C major
 Op. 13 No. 2 \ Keyboard Quartet in B flat major
 Op. 13 No. 3 \ Keyboard Quartet in C minor
 Op. 13 No. 4 \ Keyboard Quartet in D major
 Op. 14 No. 1 \ Keyboard Concerto in F minor
 Op. 14 No. 2 \ Keyboard Concerto in F major
 Op. 14 No. 3 \ Keyboard Concerto in E major
 Op. 15 No. 1 \ Keyboard Quartet in A major "Le rendez-vous"
 Op. 15 No. 2 \ Keyboard Quartet in E major "La toilette de Vénus"
 Op. 15 No. 3 \ Keyboard Quartet in G minor "Les regrets d'Herminie"
 Op. 15 No. 4 \ Keyboard Quartet in E flat major "La partie de chasse"
 Op. 16 \ Airs for keyboard

Unpublished works
 Oratorio Esther (Paris, Concert Spirituel, 8 April 1781) lost
 Opera Ariane dans l’isle de Naxos (Paris, Opéra, 24 Sept 1782)
 Ballet Feu (Paris, Opéra, 24 Sept 1782)
 Opera Diane et l’amour

References

Rita Benton: "Jean-Frédéric Edelmann, a Musical Victim of the French Revolution", Musical Quarterly, l (1964), 165–187
Rita Benton: "The Instrumental Music of Jean-Frédéric Edelmann: a Thematic Catalogue and List of Early Editions", Fontes Artis Musicae, xi (1964), 79–88
Sylvie Pécot-Douatte: A la recherche d'Edelmann le musicien guillotiné, l'Harmattan, Paris (2001)

External links
 

French Classical-period composers
Musicians from Strasbourg
1749 births
1794 deaths
French male classical composers
18th-century classical composers
French people executed by guillotine during the French Revolution
French opera composers
Male opera composers
18th-century French composers
18th-century French male musicians